Sorosis Park is municipal park in The Dalles, Oregon, United States.  The  in size and has tennis courts, a playground, disc golf course, horse shoe toss, picnic tables, shelter, bbq pit, softball fields, volleyball sand court,  and a running trail (8/10 mile).  The park was also known for a number of large Ponderosa Pines, which as of 2020 succumbed to the pine beetle infestation. The park also contains a memorial rose garden with the Vogt Fountain as the centerpiece.

History

The park was formed by the Sorosis Club, an early women's club.

References

The Dalles, Oregon
Municipal parks in Oregon
Parks in Wasco County, Oregon